Jansons (feminine: Jansone) is a Latvian surname of Scandinavian origin. Individuals with the surname include:

Arvīds Jansons (1914–1984), conductor
Jānis Jansons (born 1982), floorball player
Mariss Jansons (1943–2019), conductor

See also
Janson (name)
Jansson
Jenson

Latvian-language masculine surnames
Patronymic surnames